Core M may refer to:

 A class of processors based on the Skylake microarchitecture
 A class of processors based on the Broadwell microarchitecture

See also 
 List of Intel Core M microprocessors